Dylan des Fountain (born 7 June 1985 in Cape Town) is a former professional South African rugby union footballer. He also spent a season with Italian side Aironi.

He announced his retirement on 19 March 2014 due to a knee injury.

References

External links
 
 
 

Living people
1985 births
South African rugby union players
Stormers players
Western Province (rugby union) players
Golden Lions players
Lions (United Rugby Championship) players
Rugby union centres
Rugby union players from Cape Town
Afrikaner people